Roberto Chiacig (born 1 December 1974 in Cividale del Friuli, Italy) is an Italian former professional basketball player.

Playing as a center, his most notable achievement was the silver medal obtained by the Italian national team, of which he was a member, at the 2004 Summer Olympics.

Beyond playing internationally, he also has had a long club career in Italy, and abroad, winning an Italian League championship title with Montepaschi Siena.

Professional career
Chiacig grew up in the youth ranks of Benetton Treviso, making his debut for the side in a first division Serie A game on 6 February 1994, playing 4 minutes.

After a one-year loan to Serie A2 side Floor Padova, he broke into the first team.

The Italian moved abroad in 1996, spending one year with Greek Basket League side AEK Athens.

Returning to Italy in 1997, he signed with Teamsystem Bologna. With the Bologna team he would win the Italian Cup and Italian Supercup in 1998.
He stayed there until early 1999, finishing the season with Zucchetti Reggio Emilia.

Chiacig then spent the 1999-2000 season with Zucchetti Montecatini.

Joining Montepaschi Siena in 2000, he spent 6 seasons with the club, winning the 2001–02 FIBA Saporta Cup, the 2003–04 Lega Basket Serie A and another Italian Supercup in 2004.

He then moved to the Spanish Liga ACB in 2006, with Pamesa Valencia. However he only stayed until February 2007, finishing the season with Pallacanestro Virtus Roma.

In 2007, he joined La Fortezza Bologna, rivals of former club Fortitudo. He stayed there for two years, winning the 2008–09 FIBA EuroChallenge.

Chiacig then moved to Scafati Basket in 2009, also staying there two years.

After another season at Pallacanestro Reggiana, he joined Angelico Biella in September 2012.

He was released after around three months, joining amateur side Costone Siena in January 2013.

Chiacig only stayed a month with Costone, signing with Fortitudo Agrigento in February.

The next year he had another stint with Scafati Basket.

In 2014 Chiacig returned to the club where he had the most success, Mens Sana 1871 Siena (formerly Montepaschi), by now in the third division Serie B Basket.

International career
Making his international debut with Italy in 1994, Chiacig participated in the 1997 Summer Universiade.

With the senior Italian national basketball team, he took part in a succession of international tournaments, starting with the 1998 FIBA World Championship.

He posted 6.6 points and 3.1 rebounds, in nearly 18 minutes per game, as Italy won the gold medal at the EuroBasket 1999.

In the EuroBasket 2003, he had 22.1 points and 14.3 rebounds, in around 18, minutes as Italy took home the bronze.

While playing in the 2004 Summer Olympics, his second Summer Olympics participation after the 2000 Summer Olympics, he contributed 16.1 points and 5.1 rebounds per game, to Italy's run to the final, earning a silver medal in the process.

Chiacig's last games with the national team came during the EuroBasket 2005.

Honours and accomplishments

Individual
Premio Reverberi (Oscar del basket): Best Male Italian Player (2002)

Orders
 Order of Merit of the Italian Republic 2nd Class / Grand Officer ("Grande Ufficiale"): conferred on 27 September 2004 by President Carlo Azeglio Ciampi.

Team

Clubs
Italian LBA League Champion: (2004)
FIBA Saporta Cup Champion: (2002)
Italian Cup Winner: (1998)
FIBA EuroChallenge Champion: (2009)
Italian SuperCup Winner: (1998, 2004)

Italian senior national team
2004 Athens Summer Olympics: 
EuroBasket 1999 France: 
EuroBasket 2003 Sweden:

References

External links
Lega Basket Serie A profile Retrieved 17 June 2015 
Liga ACB profile Retrieved 17 June 2015 
EuroLeague statistics Retrieved 17 June 2015
FIBA Europe Profile Retrieved 17 June 2015

1974 births
Living people
AEK B.C. players
Basketball players at the 2000 Summer Olympics
Basketball players at the 2004 Summer Olympics
Centers (basketball)
FIBA EuroBasket-winning players
Fortitudo Agrigento players
Fortitudo Pallacanestro Bologna players
Italian men's basketball players
Italian expatriate basketball people in Greece
Italian expatriate basketball people in Spain
Italian people of Slovene descent
Lega Basket Serie A players
Liga ACB players
Medalists at the 2004 Summer Olympics
Mens Sana Basket players
Montecatiniterme Basketball players
Olympic basketball players of Italy
Olympic medalists in basketball
Olympic silver medalists for Italy
Pallacanestro Biella players
Pallacanestro Petrarca Padova players
Pallacanestro Reggiana players
Pallacanestro Treviso players
Pallacanestro Virtus Roma players
People from Cividale del Friuli
Scafati Basket players
Valencia Basket players
Virtus Bologna players
1998 FIBA World Championship players
Sportspeople from Friuli-Venezia Giulia